New Glacier is a small glacier flowing east-northeast from the low ice-covered plateau at the south side of Mackay Glacier, terminating at the southwest extremity of Granite Harbour, immediately north of Mount England, in Victoria Land. Charted and named by G. Taylor, of the British Antarctic Expedition, 1910–13, because he walked around a bluff and saw a glacier where none was expected, in the corner of Granite Harbor.

See also
Minnehaha Icefalls

Glaciers of Victoria Land
Scott Coast